The Firozabad rail disaster occurred on 20 August 1995 near Firozabad on the Delhi-Kanpur section of India's Northern Railway, at 02:55 when a passenger train collided with a train which had stopped after hitting a nilgai, killing 358 people (although some sources estimate the deaths at more than 400). The accident happened in the Indian state of Uttar Pradesh; both trains were bound for the Indian capital, New Delhi. The first train, the "Kalindi Express" from Kanpur struck a nilgai but was unable to proceed as its brakes were damaged. It was then struck from behind at a speed of 70 km/h by the Purushottam Express from Puri. Three carriages of the Kalindi express were destroyed, the engine and front two carriages of the Puri train were derailed. Most of the 2200 passengers aboard the two trains were asleep at the time of the accident.

See also
List of train accidents by death toll
List of Indian rail accidents

References

Sources
Train crash kills at least 250 in India, report from CNN.
Trains collide and explode in India

External links
Firozabad's deadliest Train Accident that killed more than 300 
Hell on Wheels (Going off the Tracks) by Meenakshi Ganguly from Time magazine
Kalindi Express 
Purushottam Express

Railway accidents in 1995
Railway accidents and incidents in Uttar Pradesh
History of Uttar Pradesh (1947–present)
1995 disasters in India
Firozabad
August 1995 events in Asia